Alphachrysovirus is a genus of double-stranded RNA viruses. It is one of two genera in the family Chrysoviridae. They infect fungi, in particular Penicillium. Their name is derived from the Greek word chrysos which means yellow-green. There are 20 species in this genus.

Structure
Viruses in the genus Alphachrysovirus are non-enveloped, with icosahedral geometries, and T=1, T=2 symmetry. The diameter is around 35–40 nm.

Genome 

Genomes are linear double-stranded RNA which is around 12.5 kbp in length. The genome codes for four proteins. The genome has three double stranded RNA segments. All have extended highly conserved terminal sequences at both ends.

Life cycle
Viral replication is cytoplasmic. Entry into the host cell is achieved by penetration into the host cell. Replication follows the double-stranded RNA virus replication model. Double-stranded RNA virus transcription is the method of transcription. The virus exits the host cell by cell to cell movement. Fungi serve as the natural host.

Taxonomy 

The following species are recognized:

 Amasya cherry disease associated chrysovirus
 Anthurium mosaic-associated chrysovirus
 Aspergillus fumigatus chrysovirus
 Brassica campestris chrysovirus
 Chrysothrix chrysovirus 1
 Colletotrichum gloeosporioides chrysovirus
 Cryphonectria nitschkei chrysovirus 1
 Fusarium oxysporum chrysovirus 1
 Helminthosporium victoriae virus 145S
 Isaria javanica chrysovirus
 Macrophomina phaseolina chrysovirus
 Penicillium brevicompactum virus
 Penicillium chrysogenum virus
 Penicillium cyaneofulvum virus
 Persea americana chrysovirus
 Raphanus sativus chrysovirus
 Salado alphachrysovirus
 Shuangao insect-associated chrysovirus
 Verticillium dahliae chrysovirus 1
 Zea mays chrysovirus 1

References

External links
 ICTV Report Chrysoviridae
 Viralzone: Chrysovirus

Chrysoviridae
Riboviria
Virus genera